The women's 69 kilograms event at the 2014 World Weightlifting Championships was held on 13–14 November 2014 in Baluan Sholak Sports Palace, Almaty, Kazakhstan.

Schedule

Medalists

Records

 Liu Chunhong's world records were rescinded in 2017.

Results

References

Results 

2014 World Weightlifting Championships
World